The Suwannee River (also spelled Suwanee River) is a river that runs through south Georgia southward into Florida in the southern United States. The Suwannee River is the site of the prehistoric Suwanee Straits that separated the panhandle from the continent.

Geography

The headwaters of the Suwannee River are in the Okefenokee Swamp in the town of Fargo, Georgia. The river runs southwestward into the Florida Panhandle, then drops in elevation through limestone layers into a rare Florida whitewater rapid. Past the rapid, the Suwanee turns west near the town of White Springs, Florida, then connects to the confluences of the Alapaha River and Withlacoochee River.

The confluences of these three rivers form the southern borderline of Hamilton County, Florida. The Suwanee then bends southward near the town of Ellaville, followed by Luraville, then joins together with the Santa Fe River from the east, south of the town of Branford.

The river ends and drains into the Gulf of Mexico on the outskirts of Suwannee.

Etymology
The Spanish recorded the native Timucua name of Guacara for the river that would later become known as the Suwannee. Different etymologies have been suggested for the modern name.
 San Juan: D.G. Brinton first suggested in his 1859 Notes on the Floridian Peninsula that Suwannee was a corruption of the Spanish San Juan. This theory is supported by Jerald Milanich, who states that "Suwannee" developed through "San Juan-ee" from the 17th century Spanish mission of San Juan de Guacara, located on the Suwannee River. 
 Shawnee: The migrations of the Shawnee (Shawnee: Shaawanwaki; Muscogee: Sawanoke) throughout the South have also been connected to the name Suwannee. As early as 1820, the Indian agent John Johnson said "the 'Suwaney' river was doubtless named after the Shawanoese [Shawnee], Suwaney being a corruption of Shawanoese." However, the primary southern Shawnee settlements were along the Savannah River, with only the village of Ephippeck on the Apalachicola River being securely identified in Florida, casting doubt on this etymology.
 "Echo": In 1884, Albert S. Gatschet claimed that Suwannee derives from the Creek word sawani, meaning "echo", rejecting the earlier Shawnee theory.  Stephen Boyd's 1885 Indian Local Names with Their Interpretation  and Henry Gannett's 1905 work The Origin of Certain Place Names in the United States repeat this interpretation, calling sawani an "Indian word" for "echo river". Gatschet's etymology also survives in more recent publications, often mistaking the language of translation. For example, a University of South Florida website states that the "Timucuan Indian word Suwani means Echo River ... River of Reeds, Deep Water, or Crooked Black Water". In 2004, William Bright repeats it again, now attributing the name "Suwanee" to a Cherokee village of Sawani, which is unlikely as the Cherokee never lived in Florida or south Georgia. This etymology is now considered doubtful: 2004's A Dictionary of Creek Muscogee does not include the river as a place-name derived from Muscogee, and also lacks entries for "echo" and for words such as svwane, sawane, or svwvne, which would correspond to the anglicization "Suwannee".

History

The Suwannee River area has been inhabited by humans for thousands of years. During the first millennium it was inhabited by the people of the Weedon Island culture, and around the year 900 a derivative local culture known as the Suwanee River Valley culture developed.

By the 16th century, the river was inhabited by two closely related Timuca-speaking peoples: the Yustaga, who lived on the west side of the river; and the Northern Utina, who lived on the east side. By 1633, the Spanish had established the missions of San Juan de Guacara, San Francisco de Chuaquin, and San Augustin de Urihica along the Suwannee to convert these western Timucua peoples.

In the 18th century, Seminoles lived by the river.

The steamboat Madison operated on the river before the Civil War, and the sulphur springs at White Springs became popular as a health resort, with 14 hotels in operation in the late 19th century.

Recreation

According to the U.S. Fish & Wildlife Service, "The Lower Suwannee National Wildlife Refuge is unlike other refuges in that it was not established for the protection of a specific species, but in order to protect the high water quality of the historic Suwannee River."

The Suwannee River Wilderness Trail is "a connected web of Florida State Parks, preserves and wilderness areas" that stretches more than 170 miles (274 kilometers), from Stephen Foster Folk Culture Center State Park to the Gulf of Mexico.

The Lower Suwannee National Wildlife Refuge offers bird and wildlife observation, wildlife photography, fishing, canoeing, hunting, and interpretive walks. Facilities include foot trails, boardwalks, paddling trails, wildlife drives, archaeological sites, observation decks and fishing piers.

Crossings

See also
List of Florida rivers
List of Georgia rivers
 South Atlantic-Gulf Water Resource Region

Notes

References
Milanich, Jerald T. (2006). Laboring in the Fields of the Lord: Spanish Missions and Southeastern Indians. University Press of Florida.

External links

 USF page with history
 EPA info on Suwannee basin
 Suwannee River Wilderness State Trail
  Info on the Suwannee River and surrounding areas from SRWMD
 Suwanee River Watershed - Florida DEP

Further reading
Light, H.M., et al. (2002). Hydrology, vegetation, and soils of riverine and tidal floodplain forests of the lower Suwannee River, Florida, and potential impacts of flow reductions [U.S. Geological Survey Professional Paper 1656A]. Denver: U.S. Department of the Interior, U.S. Geological Survey.

 
Rivers of Florida
Rivers of Georgia (U.S. state)
Drainage basins of the Gulf of Mexico
Outstanding Florida Waters
Bodies of water of Suwannee County, Florida
Bodies of water of Gilchrist County, Florida
Bodies of water of Hamilton County, Florida
Rivers of Charlton County, Georgia
Rivers of Clinch County, Georgia
Rivers of Echols County, Georgia
Rivers of Ware County, Georgia
North Florida